Council Hill Township is one of twenty-three townships in Jo Daviess County, Illinois, USA.  As of the 2010 census, its population was 141 and it contained 82 housing units.  Its name changed from Scales Township on December 6, 1853.

Geography

Cemeteries
The township contains these two cemeteries: Council Hill and Grant Hill.

Demographics

School districts
 Galena Unit School District 120
 Scales Mound Community Unit School District 211

Political districts
 Illinois' 16th congressional district
 State House District 89
 State Senate District 45

References
 
 United States Census Bureau 2007 TIGER/Line Shapefiles
 United States National Atlas

External links
 Jo Daviess County official site
 City-Data.com
 Illinois State Archives
 Township Officials of Illinois

Townships in Jo Daviess County, Illinois
Townships in Illinois